Jai Ram Thakur, the leader of BJP was sworn in as the chief minister of Himachal Pradesh on 27 December 2017. Here is the list of ministers in his Cabinet. Six of the Council ministers are Rajputs.

Council of Ministers 

|}

Former Ministers

References

 

Himachal Pradesh ministries
Lists of current Indian state and territorial ministries
Bharatiya Janata Party state ministries
2017 establishments in Himachal Pradesh
Cabinets established in 2017
Current governments